Bright's Boffins was a British children's television comedy about a team of eccentric inventors working for the British Government. It starred Alexander Doré as Group Captain Bertram Bright (referred to as "The Groupie" by his colleagues), "the hair-brained leader of a department for designing inventions that was so hush-hush even the Government had forgotten about it". It also starred Gordon Rollings and Avril Angers. It was produced by Southern Television and aired between 1970 and 1972. All 39 episodes are missing, believed lost.

References

External links
Bright's Boffins on IMDb
Memorable TV

1970 British television series debuts
1972 British television series endings
Lost television shows
English-language television shows
ITV sitcoms
1970s British children's television series
Television shows produced by Southern Television